Argilos is a municipal department of the city of Kozani in northern Greece. Located south-west of the city centre, it had a population of 379 at the 2011 census.
During the Ottoman Empire it was called Geni-kioi. The modern name of the village comes from the argil soil with the red colour.

References

Kozani
Populated places in Kozani (regional unit)